Prince Adalbert Ferdinand Berengar Viktor of Prussia (14 July 1884 – 22 September 1948) was the third son of Wilhelm II, German Emperor, by his first wife, Augusta Victoria of Schleswig-Holstein.

Early life
Prince Adalbert was born on 14 July 1884 as the third son of the then Prince Wilhelm of Prussia and his first wife, Princess Augusta Victoria of Schleswig-Holstein. He was born in the Marmorpalais of Potsdam in the Province of Brandenburg, where his parents resided until his father acceded to the throne as Emperor Wilhelm II in 1888. He spent his childhood with his siblings at the New Palace, also in Potsdam, and his school days with his brothers at the Prinzenhaus in Plön in his mother’s ancestral Schleswig-Holstein.

His bride was Princess Adelheid "Adi" of Saxe-Meiningen (16 August 1891 – 25 April 1971), daughter of Prince Frederick and Countess Adelaide of Lippe-Biesterfeld. They married on 3 August 1914 in Wilhelmshaven, Germany, and had three children, five grandchildren, six great-grandchildren and two great-great-grandchildren:

Princess Victoria Marina of Prussia (stillborn, 4 September 1915)
Princess Victoria Marina of Prussia (11 September 1917 – 21 January 1981) she married Kirby Patterson (24 July 1907–4 June 1984) on 26 September 1947. They had three children and one grandson:
Berengar Orin Bernhard Kirby Patterson (21 August 1948-18 May 2011) he married Pamela Knight in 1994.
Marina Adelaide Emily Patterson (21 August 1948-10 January 2011) she married John Engel on 24 September 1982. They had one son:
William John Engel (17 February 1983)
Dohna Maria Patterson (7 August 1954) she married Stephen Pearl on 28 July 1974. 
Prince Wilhelm Victor of Prussia (15 February 1919 – 7 February 1989), he married at Donaueschingen on 20 July 1944 Marie Antoinette, Countess of Hoyos zu Stichsenstein (Hohenthurm, 27 June 1920 – Marbella, 1 March 2004). They had two children, five grandchildren and two great-grandchildren.

Kaiserliche Marine
  Leutnant zur See (Ensign / Acting Sub-Lieutenant)
  Oberleutnant zur See (Lieutenant, Junior Grade / Sub-Lieutenant), before 1905 through at least 1908
  Kapitänleutnant (Lieutenant) on staff in SMS Kaiser, 1914
  Korvettenkapitän (Lieutenant Commander) in command of SMS Danzig, 1917
  Fregattenkapitän (Commander) in command of SMS Dresden 1918.

Regimental Commissions
  Leutnant  (2nd Lieutenant) à la suite 1. Garderegiment zu Fuß  (1st Regiment of Foot Guards), Potsdam, 1894
  à la suite, Grenadierregiment König Friedrich der Große (3. Ostpreussisches) Nr. 4
  à la suite, 1. Gardegrenadierlanwehrregiment (1st Reserve Regiment of Grenadier Guards)

Chivalric Orders
  Knight, Order of the Black Eagle with Chain (Prussia)
  Knight Grand Cross (with Crown), Order of the Red Eagle (Prussia)
  Knight, First Class, Order of the Prussian Crown
  Grand Commander, Royal House Order of Hohenzollern
 Honour Cross, First Class, Princely House Order of Hohenzollern
  Knight, First Class (with Crown in ore), House Order of the Wendish Crown (Grand Duchies of Mechlenburg)
  Knight Grand Cross, Order of the White Falcon (Grand Duchy of Saxe-Weimar-Eisenach)
  House Order of Fidelity (Baden)
  Hanseatic Cross (Bremen)
  Grand Cross of the Ludwig Order (Hesse)
  Grand Cross with golden crown of the House and Merit Order of Peter Frederick Louis (Oldenburg)
  Friedrich August Cross, 1st class
  Order of the Rue Crown (Saxony)
  Grand Cross of the Ducal Saxe-Ernestine House Order (Saxon Duchies)
  Grand Cross of the Order of the Crown with Swords (Württemberg)
  Knight, Supreme Order of the Most Holy Annunciation, Kingdom of Italy
  Knight, First Class, Order of the Netherlands Lion (Netherlands)
  Knight Grand Cross, Royal Hungarian Order of Saint Stephen, Empire of Austria-Hungary
  Knight Grand Cross, Order of Tower and Sword, Portugal
  Knight Grand Cross, Order of the Romanian Crown, Kingdom of Romania
  Knight, Order of Saint Andrew, the First Called, Imperial Russia
  Knight, (star with diamonds) Nichan Iftikhar (Order of Glory, Ottoman Empire) - 21 October 1901 - during the visit to Istanbul of SMS Charlotte, where he served
 Knight, First Class (Star with diamonds), Order of Osmanieh (Ottoman Empire)
  Knight First Class, Order of the Brilliant Star of Zanzibar, Sultanate of Zanzibar (Tanzania)
  Grand Cordon, Supreme Order of the Chrysanthemum, Imperial Japan

Military Decorations
  Gold and silver Imtiyaz Medals (Privilege, Ottoman Empire)
  Gold Liakat Medal (Merit, Ottoman Empire) - 21 October 1901 - during the visit to Istanbul of SMS Charlotte, where he served
  Iron Cross of 1914, 1st and 2nd class, Imperial Germany / Kingdom of Prussia

Death
Adalbert died in La Tour de Peilz, Switzerland, aged 64.

Ancestry

Notes

External links

Genealogy

1884 births
1948 deaths
People from the Province of Brandenburg
Prussian princes
House of Hohenzollern
Imperial German Navy personnel of World War I
Recipients of the Iron Cross (1914), 1st class
Grand Crosses of the Order of Saint Stephen of Hungary
Recipients of the Hanseatic Cross (Bremen)
Grand Crosses of the Order of the Crown (Romania)
Recipients of the Gold Imtiyaz Medal
Recipients of the Gold Liakat Medal
Sons of emperors
Military personnel from Potsdam
Children of Wilhelm II, German Emperor
Sons of kings